El Día (The Day) is a Spanish language newspaper published in the city of Santa Cruz de Tenerife (Canary Islands, Spain), founded in 1910 under the name of La Prensa.  It is the largest paper in Santa Cruz de Tenerife. According to EGM, it is the newspaper on average more daily readers of the Canary Islands.

References

External links
 

1910 establishments in Spain
Daily newspapers published in Spain
Mass media in Santa Cruz de Tenerife
Newspapers established in 1910
Spanish-language newspapers